Eusemocosma pruinosa is a moth of the family Oecophoridae. It is found in Australia.

Oecophorinae
Moths of Australia
Taxa named by Edward Meyrick
Moths described in 1884